Nigel Gordon Proverbs (22 May 1924 – 12 July 2019) was a cricketer who played first-class cricket for Barbados from 1949 to 1955.

A middle-order batsman, his highest score was 84 in 1951-52, when he added 198 for the fourth wicket with Wilfred Farmer in a Barbados total of 753 against Jamaica. He later moved to New Zealand where he played for many years for the Athletic College Old Boys Cricket Club in Nelson.

References

External links

1924 births
2019 deaths
Barbados cricketers
Barbadian cricketers